HD 72659 is a star in the equatorial constellation of Hydra. With an apparent visual magnitude of 7.46, his yellow-hued star is too faint to be viewed with the naked eye. Parallax measurements provide a distance estimate of 169.4 light years from the Sun, and it has an absolute magnitude of 3.98. The star is drifting closer with a radial velocity of −18.3 km/s.

This is a Sun-like main sequence star with a stellar classification of G2V, indicating that it is generating energy through core hydrogen fusion. It is older than the Sun with an age of about seven billion years, and is spinning with a projected rotational velocity of 5.1 km/s. The star has 7% greater mass than the Sun and a 38% larger radius. It is radiating more than double the Sun's luminosity from its photosphere at an effective temperature of 5,956 K. The metallicity of the stellar atmosphere is similar to the Sun.

Planetary system
An extrasolar planet was discovered orbiting this star in 2003 via the Doppler method. This is a superjovian planet with an eccentric orbit, completing a lap around its host star every . In 2022, the inclination and true mass of HD 72659 b were measured via astrometry, along with the detection of a second substellar companion, likely a brown dwarf.

See also 
 HD 73256
 List of extrasolar planets

References

External links 

G-type main-sequence stars
Planetary systems with one confirmed planet
Hydra (constellation)
Durchmusterung objects
072659
042030
J08340320-0134056